Puchalapalli (Telugu: పుచ్చలపల్లి) is an Indian surname.

Notable people with the surname include:
 Puchalapalli Penchalaiah (born 1924), Parliament member from Nellore
 Puchalapalli Sundaraiah (1913–1985), CPI leader of Andhra Pradesh

Telugu-language surnames